Cayetana Elizabeth "Tana" Ramsay (née Hutcheson; born 23 August 1974) is an English TV broadcaster and author of several cookery books.

Early life
Ramsay was born in Croydon, South London, United Kingdom, and raised in a barn in Kent. Her father, Chris Hutcheson, is a businessman. Cayetana worked for her father before pursuing a career in education.

Career
Ramsay trained as a Montessori teacher.

In 2010, Ramsay appeared on the ITV show Dancing on Ice, partnered by professional skater Stuart Widdall, being eliminated in the fourth week. She has been a presenter of UKTV's food show Market Kitchen. In 2013, she often appeared on Gordon Ramsay's Home Cooking to teach home cooking alongside her husband. In 2014, she appeared in the  American version of cooking show MasterChef, co-hosted by her husband, Gordon Ramsay, and also Gordon's other show Hell's Kitchen, which she featured on three episodes between 2009 and 2010. Since 2015, Ramsay has starred in her daughter's show Matilda and the Ramsay Bunch on CBBC.

Personal life
Ramsay married Gordon Ramsay in London on 21 December 1996. They have five children: Megan (b.1998), Holly (b.1999), Jack (b.1999), Matilda (Tilly) (b.2001), and Oscar (b.2019). Oscar was born after Ramsay had a miscarriage in 2016. In an interview, Gordon Ramsay detailed how he and his wife struggled to conceive due to her polycystic ovary syndrome.

References

External links

1974 births
Living people
Place of birth missing (living people)
English food writers
English non-fiction writers
Schoolteachers from Surrey
English television chefs
English television presenters
Women cookbook writers

Writers from London